Shafiqul Azam Khan is a Bangladesh Awami League politician and the incumbent Member of Parliament from Jhenaidah-3. He studied at Rajshahi University.

Early life
Khan was born on 20 December 1966. He completed his undergraduate and Masters in law university of Rajshahi.

Career
Khan was elected to Parliament in 2008 from Jhenaidah-3 as a Bangladesh Awami League candidate. He faced a legal challenge from the Bangladesh Election Commission because he contested the election while he was the Mayor of Moheshpur municipality. The commission asked why his candidacy should not be cancelled for violating the electoral code.

References

Awami League politicians
Living people
1966 births
9th Jatiya Sangsad members
11th Jatiya Sangsad members